Yan Valery (born 22 February 1999) is a professional footballer who plays as a right-back for Ligue 1 club Angers and the Tunisia national team.

He began his senior career in England with Premier League club Southampton and spent the second half of the 2020–21 season on loan at Championship club Birmingham City before joining Angers in 2022. In international football, he represented his native France at under-17 and under-18 levels before switching to his mother's country of Tunisia at senior level in 2022.

Early life
Valery was born in Champigny-sur-Marne, France to a Martiniquais father and Tunisian mother. He is a Muslim.

Club career

Southampton
Valery joined Southampton in 2015 from Stade Rennais. On 27 November 2018, Southampton boss Mark Hughes handed Valery his first team debut in an EFL Cup match against Leicester City. Four days later, he made his league debut, playing the whole match in a 2–2 draw against Manchester United.

On 2 March 2019, Valery scored his first Southampton goal in a 3–2 defeat away to Manchester United, opening the scoring with "an outstanding finish". The week later, Valery scored again in a 2–1 win at home to Tottenham Hotspur. Valery ended the season with a total of 23 appearances. At the end of the season, Valery was voted as 'Saints Young Player of the Season'.

Despite this, the 2019–20 season would be tough for Valery, who only made a total of 11 starts for Southampton. Valery later revealed that he had glandular fever which kept him out for a significant part of the season. The arrival of Kyle Walker-Peters from Tottenham Hotspur, initially on loan, made it harder for Valery to get back into the Southampton first team.

On 26 January 2021, Valery made his first Premier League start of the season in Southampton's 3–1 defeat to Arsenal.

Loan to Birmingham City
On 1 February 2021, Valery joined Championship club Birmingham City for the remainder of the 2020–21 season. He made his debut five days later as a late substitute in a 3–2 loss away to AFC Bournemouth, and replaced Maxime Colin in the starting eleven for the next fixture, another defeat. He made seven appearances (two starts) in the early part of his loan spell but had no matchday involvement after Lee Bowyer took over as head coach in mid-March.

Angers 
On 1 September 2022, Valery joined Ligue 1 club Angers on a four-year contract.

International career
Valery has represented France at both under-17 and under-18 level. In January 2019, he met with Tunisia manager Alain Giresse and agreed to play for the Tunisia national team.

In September 2022, Valery accepted a call-up to play for Tunisia in friendlies against Comoros and Brazil in preparation for the 2022 FIFA World Cup. He made his debut as a late substitute in the 5–1 loss to Brazil on 27 September.

Career statistics

References

External links

Southampton FC profile 

1999 births
Living people
People from Champigny-sur-Marne
Citizens of Tunisia through descent
Tunisian footballers
Tunisia international footballers
French footballers
France youth international footballers
Association football defenders
Southampton F.C. players
Birmingham City F.C. players
Angers SCO players
Premier League players
English Football League players
Ligue 1 players
French expatriate footballers
French expatriate sportspeople in England
Expatriate footballers in England
Tunisian people of Martiniquais descent
French sportspeople of Tunisian descent
French people of Martiniquais descent